Calto is an opera seria in three acts by Francesco Bianchi. The libretto was by Giuseppe Maria Foppa, after the 'Celtic' poetry of Ossian. The opera was first performed at the Teatro San Benedetto in  Venice on 23 January 1788.

Calto was an innovative work with some special instrumentation. As Marita P. McClymonds explains "Bianchi uses flat keys, fluctuating modes, chromatic dissonances and an unusually wide range of wind timbres (oboe, bassoon, clarinet, horn and English horn) for maximum dramatic effect."

Roles

Synopsis
Calto claims his rightful throne from the usurper Duntalmo, but the latter is saved by Corimba, who turns out to be both Duntalmo's daughter and the mother of Calto's two children.

References

McClymonds, Marita P (1992), 'Calto' in The New Grove Dictionary of Opera, ed. Stanley Sadie (London) 

Opera seria
Operas by Francesco Bianchi
1788 operas
Italian-language operas
Operas